Setz is the family name of:

 Heinrich Setz (1915–1943), German soldier
 Wolfram Setz (born 1941), German historian
 Clemens J. Setz (born 1982), Austrian author and translator